Klympush or Klimpush (Ukrainian or Russian: Климпуш) is a gender-neutral Ukrainian surname that may refer to
Ivanna Klympush-Tsintsadze (born 1972), Ukrainian politician and journalist
Orest Klympush (born 1941), Ukrainian engineer, politician and diplomat, father of Ivanna

Ukrainian-language surnames